Hilary Knight (born November 1, 1926) is an American writer and artist. He is the illustrator of more than 50 books and the author of nine books. He is best known as the illustrator and co-creator of Kay Thompson's Eloise (1955) and others in the Eloise series.

Knight has illustrated for a wide variety of clients, creating artwork for magazines, children's fashion advertisements, greeting cards, record albums and posters for Broadway musicals, including Gypsy, Irene, Half A Sixpence, Hallelujah Baby! and No, No, Nanette.

Influences
One of two sons of artist-writers Clayton Knight and Katharine Sturges Dodge, Hilary Knight was born on Long Island in Hempstead. His father illustrated aviation books, and his mother was a fashion and book illustrator. Living in Roslyn, New York, as a child, Hilary was age six when he moved to Manhattan with his family. Knight attended the City and Country School (class of 1940) for elementary and middle school and Friends Seminary for high school.

Knight recalled:

After study with George Grosz and Reginald Marsh at the Art Students League, Knight labored as a ship painter while serving in the navy from 1944 to 1946. Returning to New York, he studied architectural drafting (at Delahanty Institute), interior design, and theater design, working for one summer as an assistant designer at a theater in Ogunquit, Maine. He painted murals in private homes and entered the field of magazine illustration, starting with Mademoiselle in 1952, followed by House & Garden, Gourmet, McCalls, and Woman's Home Companion. His work as a humorous illustrator was strongly influenced by the British cartoonist Ronald Searle.

Books
In 1955, he collaborated with Kay Thompson to create the whimsical black, white, and pink look of Eloise. Knight says that the image of Eloise was based on a 1930s painting by his mother Katherine Sturges Dodge. The live CBS television adaptation on Playhouse 90 (1956) with Evelyn Rudie as Eloise received such negative reviews that Kay Thompson vowed never to allow another film or TV adaptation.

Three book sequels followed: Eloise in Paris (1957), Eloise at Christmastime (1958) and Eloise in Moscow (1959). Thompson and Knight teamed to create another sequel, Eloise Takes a Bawth, working with children's book editor Ursula Nordstrom. That title was announced in the Harper Books for Boys and Girls fall 1964 catalog, but in the mid-1960s, Thompson removed the three Eloise sequels from print and did not allow Eloise Takes a Bawth to be published. It was an action that deprived her collaborator of income for decades (a situation that changed with Thompson's death in 1998). In Salon, Amy Benfer speculated on Thompson's motives in "Will the real Eloise please stand up?" (June 1, 1999):

Eloise Takes a Bawth was finally published in 2002. Knight recalled:

Knight also illustrated most of the Mrs. Piggle-Wiggle books. Other publications with Knight illustrations include Good Housekeeping and the children's magazine Cricket. In addition to creating children's picture books—among them, in collaboration with poet Margaret Fishback, A Child's Book of Natural History (USA: Platt & Monk, 1969), a revision and extension of A Child's Primer of Natural History by Oliver Herford—Knight has illustrated for other genres, such as Peg Bracken's The I Hate to Cook Book. The roll call of artists Knight admires includes Ludwig Bemelmans, Joseph Hirsch, Leo Lionni, Robert Vickrey, and Garth Williams.

His 1964 book Where's Wallace?, featuring an orangutan that kept escaping from the zoo to visit different places such as a circus, museum, department store, beach etc. and who had to be located in each of the books panoramic pictures, anticipated Where's Waldo? by more than 20 years.

The Algonquin Cat written by Val Schaffner with drawings by Hilary Knight is a charmingly illustrated story about a real cat that resides in the Algonquin Hotel in New York City.  There have been numerous cats in the hotel over the years. This is a delightful addition to the numerous books with Mr. Knight's art work. Published by Delacorte Press/Eleanor Friede in 1980.

Galleries
Over the decades, Knight maintained an apartment in midtown Manhattan, which also served as his studio and library. Here, he adds to his collection of books, sheet music, programs, and soundtrack and cast recordings. He is represented by two galleries—the Giraffics Gallery (East Hampton, New York) and Every Picture Tells a Story (Santa Monica, California).

In other media
The 2015 HBO documentary It's Me, Hilary: The Man Who Drew Eloise, by Lena Dunham, chronicles Knight's work on Eloise, personal life, and tumultuous relationship with Kay Thompson.

Works
 The Circus Is Coming, 1947
 Jeremiah Octopus (by Margaret Stone Zilboorg), 1962
 Angels and Berries and Candy Canes, 1963
 Christmas Stocking Story, 1963
 Firefly in a Fir Tree, 1963
 Christmas in a Nutshell Library, 1963
 The Night Before Christmas, 1963
 Where's Wallace?, 1964
 When I Have A Little Girl, 1965
 When I Have A Little Boy, 1967
 Matt's Mitt, 1976
 That Makes Me Mad, 1976
 Hilary Knight's Cinderella, 1978
 The Circus is Coming, 1978
 The Algonquin Cat, 1980
 The Twelve Days of Christmas, 1981
 The Owl and the Pussy-Cat (by Edward Lear), 1983
 ’’Telephone Time: A First Book of Telephone Do’s and Don’t’s’’, 1986
 The Best Little Monkeys in the World, 1987
 Side by Side: Poems To Read Together (verse compilation), 1988
 The Beauty and the Beast, 1990
 Sunday Morning, 1992
 Happy Birthday (verse compilation), 1993
 The Mrs. Piggle-Wiggle Treasury, 1995
 When I Have A Little Girl/When I Have A Little Boy, 2000
 Eloise Takes a Bawth, 2002
 A Christmas Stocking Story, 2003
 Eloise: The Absolutely Essential, 2005
 Hilary Knight: Drawn from Life, 2018
 Olive & Oliver: The Formative Years, 2019

References

External links
  
 Meet the Writers: Hilary Knight at Barnes & Noble (archived 2015)
 Eloise Website: Hilary Knight (archived 2016)
 "Will the real Eloise please stand up?" at Salon by Amy Benfer (June 1, 1999)
 
 

1926 births
American children's writers
American children's book illustrators
Eloise (books)
Living people
People from East Hampton (town), New York
People from Roslyn, New York
Artists from New York (state)
Writers from New York (state)
American gay artists